Danièle Dubroux (born September 4, 1947, Paris) is a French director, screenwriter, and actress.

Filmography

As director
Short films
 1978 : Les Deux Élèves préférés du professeur Francine Brouda
 1982 : Sœur Anne ne vois-tu rien venir ?. Episode of collective film Die Erbtöchter

Feature-length films
 1976 : L’Olivier, co-directed with le Groupe Cinéma Vincennes
 1984 : Les Amants terribles, co-directed with Stavros Kaplanidis
 1987 : La Petite Allumeuse
 1992 : Border Line
 1996 : Le Journal du séducteur
 1998 : L'Examen de minuit
 2004 : Éros thérapie

As screenwriter
 1998 : … Comme elle respire (co-writer)
 2000 : La Chambre obscure
 2003 : Après vous

As actress
 1978 : Les Deux Élèves préférés du professeur Francine Brouda
 1980 : Cauchemar
 1982 : Sœur Anne ne vois-tu rien venir?
 1984 : Laisse béton
 1984 : Les Amants terribles
 1992 : Border Line
 1996 : Le Journal du séducteur
 1998 : L'Examen de minuit
 1998 : L'École de la chair

References

French filmmakers
1947 births
Living people